Changping Road is a station on Line 7 of the Shanghai Metro. It is situated within the inner ring-road in Jing'an District. It began operation in December 2009, together with the other stations on the line. The station has a side platform layout.

Railway stations in Shanghai
Line 7, Shanghai Metro
Shanghai Metro stations in Jing'an District
Railway stations in China opened in 2009